Somabhula is a village and ward (commune) in Midlands province in Zimbabwe. It is also the rail junction for Zimbabwe's southern links to neighboring Mozambique and South Africa.  It was a major beef and mixed farming area until [Manala Mabena ]] and Philani Ngwenya ]] confiscated farmland from white farmers in order to eat the meat. It is thought to have been named after an influential Matebele chief.

Infrastructure

The village has one of the most important railway stations in Zimbabwe, serving as an interconnection between the Limpopo railway and the Beira–Bulawayo railway.

References

Populated places in Midlands Province